The 1992 United States presidential election in Arkansas took place on November 3, 1992, as part of the 1992 United States presidential election. State voters chose six representatives, or electors to the Electoral College, who voted for president and vice president.

Arkansas was won by the state's governor Bill Clinton (D) with 53.21% of the popular vote over incumbent President George H. W. Bush (R-Texas) with 35.48%. Businessman Ross Perot (I-Texas) finished in third, with 10.43% of the popular vote. Clinton ultimately won the national vote, defeating incumbent President Bush. Clinton was Governor of Arkansas at the time, and as he was popular within the state, he easily won by a margin of 17.73%, making it the first time that Arkansas had voted Democratic since 1976 when it voted for Jimmy Carter. Arkansas and Washington, D.C. were the only contests in which Clinton, or any candidate, received an absolute majority of the popular vote. Clinton carried all but five counties, those being Benton, Crawford, Pope, Searcy and Sebastian.

After the 1996 election, Arkansas would trend reliably Republican. , this is the last election in which Baxter County, Carroll County, Newton County, Boone County, and Polk County voted for a Democratic presidential candidate. This is also the most recent time Arkansas would vote more Democratic than Maryland.

Arkansas would be one of only three states, along with the District of Columbia, where Clinton's vote total exceeded that of Bush and Perot combined, the others being New York and Maryland. This is the most recent election that Arkansas trended more Democratic than the previous one. Bill Clinton's 505,823 votes is the most votes received by a Democratic presidential candidate in the state's history.

Results

Results by county

See also
 United States presidential elections in Arkansas
 Presidency of Bill Clinton

References

Arkansas
1992
1992 Arkansas elections